{{Infobox comics creator
| name          = Greg LaRocque
| birth_date    = 
| birth_place   = Baltimore, Maryland
| death_date    =
| death_place   =
| nationality   = American
| pencil        = y
| notable works = The AvengersThe Flash vol. 2Legion of Super-Heroes vol. 3Power Man and Iron Fist
}}
Greg LaRocque (born February 24, 1954) is an American comics artist best known for his work on the Legion of Super-Heroes and The Flash.

Born and raised in Baltimore, Maryland, LaRocque worked as an assistant teacher at the Professional Institute of Art while still a teenager. He started his art career in the advertising field.

Comics career
Greg LaRocque began his comics career at DC Comics and his first published work was the story "That Which Conquers All" in Mystery in Space #115 (Jan. 1981). This was followed by a series of OMAC back-up stories in The Warlord #42–47 (Feb.–July 1981). His first work for Marvel Comics appeared in Power Man and Iron Fist #73 (Sept. 1981). He drew several issues of Marvel Team-Up including the last issue of the series. He and writer Louise Simonson then launched a new Spider-Man title, Web of Spider-Man, in April 1985. After returning to DC Comics, LaRocque became prominent for his work illustrating the Legion of Super-Heroes. He stated in a 2013 interview that "I decided to leave Marvel for personal reasons, and the first person I called was [editor] Karen Berger. She handed me the next available Legion script, and the day I handed in the work she offered me the book." He drew The Flash with writer William Messner-Loebs from issue #15 (Aug. 1988) through #79 (Aug. 1993). A career highlight was redesigning the Flash's costume. LaRocque and Messner-Loebs introduced Linda Park as a supporting character in the series in The Flash vol. 2 #28 (July 1989) and reintroduced the Pied Piper as a reformed villain and established the character as gay, in issue #53 (Aug. 1991).

Exiled Studio released LaRocque's creator owned material in the three-issue mini-series The Exiled, followed by CryBaby, Exiled Studio's first color comic book. The CryBaby story arc was concluded in the 80-page graphic novel Extinction. LaRocque's The Dreaming graphic novel was published by Exiled Studio in 2009.

LaRocque's work among the independent companies includes London Night Studios, Peregrine Entertainment, Realm Press, Catfish Comics, and Avatar Press. In 2010 he helped launch the revival of Dave Cockrum's Futurians with a cover for David Miller Studio. LaRocque's fantasy art was exhibited at Gallery Provocateur in Chicago to coincide with his appearance at the 2010 Chicago ComicCon. He returned to DC Comics in 2011 to draw the DC Retroactive: The Flash - The '80s one-shot.

Bibliography
Alternative Comics
 9–11 Emergency Relief (2002)

DC Comics

 The Big Book of Conspiracies (1995)
 The Big Book of Hoaxes (1996)
 DC Retroactive: The Flash – The '80s #1 (2011)
 Fighting American #1–6 (1994)
 The Flash vol. 2 #15–18, 20–22, 24–28, 30–59, 62–65, 67–71, 73–79, Annual #2–3 (1988–1993)
 Ghosts #98, 103 (1981)
 Justice League America Annual #7 (1993)
 Justice League Quarterly #13 (1993)
 Justice League Task Force #9, 16 (1994)
 Legion of Super-Heroes vol. 3 #15, 17–48, Annual #3 (1985–1988)
 Mystery in Space #115 (1981)
 Primal Force #7 (1995)
 Secrets of Haunted House #33–34, 36, 41, 46 (1981–1982)
 Showcase '95 #3 (Eradicator) (1995)
 Steel #17 (1995)
 The Unexpected #207 (1981)
 The Warlord #42–47 (OMAC back-up stories) (1981)
 Weird War Tales #95, 104 (1981)
 Who's Who in the DC Universe #2–3, 10, 16 (1990–1992)
 Who's Who in the DC Universe Update 1993 #1 (1992)
 Who's Who in the Legion of Super-Heroes #1–7 (1988)
 Who's Who: The Definitive Directory of the DC Universe #7, 11, 13–14, 19, 21, 24–25 (1985–1987)
 Who's Who: Update '87 #1–3, 5 (1987)
 Who's Who: Update '88 #3–4 (1988)

Exiled Studio
 The Exiled #1 (1998)

London Night
 Razor: Uncut #39–40, 42 (1997)

Marvel Comics

 The Amazing Spider-Man Annual #15 (1981)
 The Avengers #222–223, 225–226 (1982)
 Bizarre Adventures #32 (1982)
 The Incredible Hulk vol. 2 #279 (1983)
 Marvel Comics Presents #55 (Collective Man) (1990)
 Marvel Graphic Novel #16 ("The Aladdin Effect") (1985)
 Marvel Super-Heroes vol. 2 #11, 13–14 (1992–1993)
 Marvel Team-Up #137–138, 141–148, 150 (1984–1985)
 Micronauts #37 (1982)
 Moon Knight #21–22 (1982)
 Official Handbook of the Marvel Universe #5, 10 (1983)
 Power Man and Iron Fist #73, 91, 103–104, 106, 108–113 (1981–1985)
 Rom #25, Annual #1 (back-up stories) (1981–1982)
 The Spectacular Spider-Man #60, 63, 83, 124 (1981–1987)
 Thor #323 (1982)
 Web of Spider-Man #1–5 (1985)
 What If...?'' #32, 35 (1982)

References

External links
 
 Greg LaRocque at Mike's Amazing World of Comics
 Greg LaRocque at the Unofficial Handbook of Marvel Comics Creators

1954 births
20th-century American artists
21st-century American artists
Advertising artists and illustrators
American comics artists
Artists from Baltimore
DC Comics people
Living people
Marvel Comics people